A war college is a senior military academy which is normally intended for veteran military officers and whose purpose is to educate and 'train on' senior military tacticians, strategists, and leaders. It is also often the place where advanced tactical and strategic thought is conducted, both for the purpose of developing doctrine and for the purpose of identifying implications and shifts in long-term patterns.

Examples:
Naval Colleges
Naval War College, Goa of the Indian Navy  
Naval War College (Japan) of the Imperial Japanese Navy (Defunct)
Pakistan Naval War College of the Pakistan Navy
Naval War College of the United States Navy
Royal Naval War College of the Royal Navy (Defunct)

Army Colleges
Army War College, Mhow of the Indian Army
Army War College (Japan) of the Imperial Japanese Army (Defunct)
United States Army War College of the United States Army

Air Force Colleges
College of Air Warfare of the Indian Air Force
PAF Air War College of the Pakistan Air Force
USAF Air War College of the United States Air Force
RAF College of Air Warfare of the Royal Air Force (Defunct)

War Colleges
War College of the Azerbaijani Armed Forces of the Azerbaijani Armed Forces
National Defence College (Bangladesh) of the Ministry of Defence (Bangladesh)
Marine Corps War College of the United States Marine Corps
National War College of the United States Department of Defense

War colleges